Patrick IV, 8th Earl of Dunbar and Earl of March (124210 October 1308), sometimes called Patrick de Dunbar "8th" Earl of March, was the most important magnate in the border regions of Scotland. He was one of the Competitors for the Crown of Scotland.

Succession 

Said to be aged 47 at his father's death, Sir Patrick de Dunbar, Knight, Earl of Dunbar, had livery of his father's lands on 14 May 1290. It appears that this Earl of Dunbar assumed the additional alternate title Earl of March, as he appeared designated Comes de Marchia at the parliament at Birgham in 1290, for the purpose of betrothing the Princess Margaret to the son of King Edward I of England. (This failed to come about).

Ambition and submission 

Patrick was one of the "seven earls of Scotland," a distinct body separate from the other estates of the realm, who claimed the right to elect a king in cases of disputed succession. He was one of the Competitors for the Crown of Scotland in 1291, when he entered a formal claim in right of his great-grandmother, Ada, Countess of Dunbar, an illegitimate daughter of William The Lion, King of Scots. Like so many Scottish noblemen, including the Bruces, Dunbar held lands in England also which required knights' services, and he was summoned by King Edward I in 1294 to assist him at war in Gascony.

Fealty, then disobedience

The Earl of Dunbar and March, with the Earl of Angus, Robert Bruce the elder, and his son the Earl of Carrick, swore fealty to the English King at Wark on 25 March 1296. In this turbulent year he appears to have been betrayed by his wife, who took the Scottish side and retained the castle of Dunbar for Balliol, but was obliged to surrender it to King Edward I of England in April 1296. In 1297 it appears that the Earl ceased his allegiance to Edward I, held his lands of the Scottish Crown, and was favourably received by Sir William Wallace, with whom he had been in bitter battle the previous year.

In 1298 he was King's Lieutenant for Scotland, and in 1300 was present at the siege of Caerlaverock Castle, with his eldest son and heir, Patrick.

Marriage 

The Earl married, before 1282, Marjorie, daughter of Alexander Comyn, Earl of Buchan by his spouse Elizabeth, daughter of Roger de Quincy, 2nd Earl of Winchester by Ellen of Galloway.

They had known issue:
 Patrick de Dunbar, 9th Earl of March (1285–1369).
 John de Dunbar of Derchester & Birkynside.
 George de Dunbar, ancestor of the Mochrum family.
 Cecilia (not to be mistaken for Cecily, her aunt, who married James Stewart, High Steward of Scotland. Cecilia was probably born c.1291)

Notes

References
Miller, James, The History of Dunbar, Dunbar, 1830, pp. 24–34.
Bain, Joseph, Calendar of Documents relating to Scotland, vol.IV, 1357–1509, pps.xx - xxiv, Edinburgh, 1888, for relationships in this Dunbar family refer to the 'Introduction' with other references in the main sections of the volume.
Dunbar, Sir Archibald H., Bt., Scottish Kings, a Revised Chronology of Scottish History, 1005 - 1625, Edinburgh, 1899, pp. 87–93 and 282.

1242 births
1308 deaths
Competitors for the Crown of Scotland
Scottish soldiers
People from East Lothian
Earls of March (Scotland)
13th-century mormaers
14th-century Scottish earls